The Arwin Charisma Museum is a museum in Yangmei District, Taoyuan City, Taiwan.

Architecture
The museum combines the industries of cosmetics, healthcare, foods, underwear and spa, which was created using Bali elements of thatched buildings and stone sculptures, relaxing music and mist that gives the fragrance of essential oils permeate the air. The museum has a total floor area of nearly 1 hectare.

Transportation
The museum is accessible within walking distance south from Yangmei Station of the Taiwan Railways.

See also
 List of museums in Taiwan

References

External links
  

2006 establishments in Taiwan
Industry museums in Taiwan
Museums established in 2006
Museums in Taoyuan City